Since November 2015 Ukrainian authorities, state agencies and local government authorities are forbidden to act as founders (or cofounders) of printed media outlets.

According to a law that went into effect on 16 January 2022, all print media in Ukraine must be published in the state language,  Ukrainian. This rule does not apply to material published exclusively in Crimean Tatar, in other languages ​​of the indigenous peoples of Ukraine or in (another) official languages of the European Union.



See also

Human rights in Ukraine
List of magazines in Ukraine
List of newspapers
List of newspapers in Ukrainian SSR
Mass media in Ukraine
Open access in Ukraine to scholarly communication
Ukraine

References

Ukraine, List of newspapers in
Newspapers